Splicing factor 3B subunit 4 is a protein that in humans is encoded by the SF3B4 gene.

Function 

This gene encodes one of four subunits of the splicing factor 3B. The protein encoded by this gene cross-links to a region in the pre-mRNA immediately upstream of the branchpoint sequence in pre-mRNA in the prespliceosomal complex A. It also may be involved in the assembly of the B, C and E spliceosomal complexes. In addition to RNA-binding activity, this protein interacts directly and highly specifically with subunit 2 of the splicing factor 3B. This protein contains two N-terminal RNA-recognition motifs (RRMs), consistent with the observation that it binds directly to pre-mRNA.

Disease associations 

In 2012, Canadian researchers belonging to the FORGE (Finding of Rare disease GEnes) consortium identified new dominant mutations in SF3B4 as the cause of Nager syndrome, a rare type of mandibulofacial dysostosis with associated limb malformations.

Interactions 

SF3B4 has been shown to interact with CDC5L, BMPR1A and SF3B2.

References

Further reading

External links